Gyzyldag (Azerbaijani: Qızıldağ) is a mountain in Azerbaijan with a height of 1319.1 meters above sea level, in the Shahbuz district of the Nakhchivan Autonomous Republic, on the border with the Babek district.

Geography 
It is located 19 kilometers north-east of the city of Nakhichevan, 4 kilometers north-east of Jagri, on the right bank of the middle course of the Nakhchivanchay river, in the interfluve of Nakhchivanchay and Jagrichay.

The Khal-Khal deposit of native copper is located one kilometer to the south-east of Gyzyldag. The deposit was studied in 1961-1963 by G. Mammadov and M. Mammadov. In 1980–1981, the deposit was explored in detail by V.  Nagiyev and Y. Kerimov.

See also 
 Geography of Azerbaijan

References 

Geography of Azerbaijan